Robert de Ferrers, 3rd Baron Ferrers of Chartley (Chartley, Staffordshire, 25 March 1309 – 28 August 1350), was the son of John de Ferrers, 1st Baron Ferrers of Chartley and Hawise de Muscegros, a daughter of Robert de Muscegros.

He had inherited the title Baron Ferrers of Chartley from his elder brother John, 2nd Baron, between 1321 and July 1324, and was summoned to parliament on 25 February 1342.

Robert served frequently in the Scottish and French wars of Edward III as well as participating the victory at Cressy.

Before 20 October 1333, he married a woman named Margaret. They had one son, John who succeeded his father as John de Ferrers, 4th Baron Ferrers of Chartley.

After the death of Margaret, Robert remarried to Joan de la Mote before 1350. They had one son, Sir Robert Ferrers, summoned to parliament as 'Robert Ferrers of Wem' as husband of Elizabeth Boteler, 4th Baroness Boteler of Wem, by whom he had Robert Ferrers of Wem.

Robert de Ferrers, 3rd Baron Ferrers of Chartley, died on 28 August 1350.

References

See also
Earl of Derby
Earl of Hereford

1309 births
1350 deaths
03
14th-century English people